The European Union Customs Union (EUCU), formally known as the Community Customs Union, is a customs union which consists of all the member states of the European Union (EU), Monaco, and the British Overseas Territory of Akrotiri and Dhekelia. Some detached territories of EU states do not participate in the customs union, usually as a result of their geographic separation. In addition to the EUCU, the EU is in customs unions with Andorra, San Marino and Turkey (with the exceptions of certain goods), through separate bilateral agreements.

There are no tariffs or non-tariff barriers to trade between the members of the customs union and unlike a free-trade area members of the customs union impose a common external tariff on all goods entering the union.

The European Commission negotiates for and on behalf of the Union as a whole in international trade deals, rather than each member state negotiating individually. It also represents the Union in the World Trade Organization and any trade disputes mediated through it.

Common external tariffs
The EU Customs Union sets the tariff rates for imports to the EU from other countries. These rates are detailed and depend on the specific type of product imported, and can also vary by the time of year. The full WTO Most Favoured Nation tariff rates apply only to those countries that do not have a Free Trade Agreement with the EU, or are not on a WTO recognised exemption scheme such as Everything but Arms (an EU support arrangement for Least Developed Countries).

Union and common transit
Union transit, formerly called "Community transit", is a system generally applicable to the movement of non-Union goods for which customs duties and other charges due on import have not been paid, and of Union goods, which, between their point of departure and point of destination in the EU, have to pass through the territory of a third country.

The 'common' transit procedure is used for the movement of goods between the EU Member States, the EFTA countries (Iceland, Norway, Liechtenstein and Switzerland), Turkey (since 1 December 2012), the Republic of North Macedonia (since 1 July 2015) and Serbia (since 1 February 2016). The operation of the common transit procedure with the UK is ensured as the UK has deposited its instrument of accession on 30 January 2019 with the Secretariat of the Council of the EU. The procedure is based on the Convention of 20 May 1987 on a common transit procedure. The rules are effectively identical to those of the Union transit.

Edward Kellett-Bowman MEP, as rapporteur for a European Parliament Committee of Inquiry, presented a report to the Parliament in February 1997  which identified the removal of border controls and a lack of co-operation by member states as being responsible for a rise in organised crime and smuggling. Kellett-Bowman's report led to the European Union setting up a customs investigation body and computerising transit-monitoring systems.

Union Customs Code
The Union Customs Code (UCC), intended to modernise customs procedures, entered into force on 1 May 2016. Implementation will take place over a period of time and full implementation is anticipated by 31 December 2020 at the latest. The European Commission has stated that the aims of the UCC are simplicity, service and speed.

Non-EU participants
Monaco and the British Overseas Territory of Akrotiri and Dhekelia are integral parts of the EU's customs territory.

EU territories with opt-outs
While all EU member states are part of the customs union, not all of their respective territories participate. Territories of member states which have remained outside of the EU (overseas territories of the European Union) generally do not participate in the customs union.

However, some territories within the EU do not participate in the customs union for tax and/or geographical reasons:
Büsingen am Hochrhein (German exclave within Switzerland, part of the Swiss Customs Area)
Heligoland (small German archipelago in the North Sea with VAT free status)
Livigno (remote Alpine town in Italy with VAT free status)
Ceuta and Melilla (Spanish territories in Africa with VAT free status).

Historical opt outs
The following territories were excluded until the end of 2019:
Campione d'Italia (an exclave of Italy surrounded by Swiss territory)
the Italian waters of Lake Lugano

Bilateral customs unions
Andorra, San Marino and Turkey are each in a customs union with the EU.

Special arrangements concerning territories of the United Kingdom
The United Kingdom of Great Britain and Northern Ireland left the European Union on 31 January 2020 and transition arrangements ended on 31 December 2020. Special arrangements have been made for those parts of the United Kingdom and its territories that share a land border with an EU member state.

Northern Ireland

Northern Ireland is no longer a member of the European Union Customs Union: its trade with Great Britain and its trade with the European Union are each now regulated by the EU–UK Trade and Cooperation Agreement, the European Union (Future Relationship) Act 2020 and the United Kingdom Internal Market Act 2020. These include special provisions for trade in goods between Northern Ireland and the EU which for many purposes are similar to those that apply within the Customs Union, although Northern Ireland remains part of United Kingdom Customs territory.

Gibraltar

Gibraltar left the EU concurrently with the United Kingdom. When part of the EU, it was one of the EU territories with opt-outs and had not been part of the Customs Union. An agreement in principle has been reached between the EU, the United Kingdom, and Gibraltar to negotiate a treaty which would include provisions for trade on goods between the EU and Gibraltar. These would be "substantially similar" to those within the Customs Union.  the agreement has not yet been concluded.

Akrotiri and Dhekelia 
As already noted above, the British Overseas Territory of Akrotiri and Dhekelia on the island of Cyprus are integral parts of the EU's customs territory.

See also
 
 
EU VAT area
 
European Economic Area (EU and EFTA except Switzerland) 
European Free Trade Association (EFTA)

Explanatory footnotes

References

External links
TARIC database enquiry system, gives current tariff rates applicable by exporting country and seasonEuropean Commission: Communication and Information Resource Centre for Administrations, Businesses and Citizens.
TARIC and Quota Data & Information: user guides for the TARIC database aboveEuropean Commission: Communication and Information Resource Centre for Administrations, Businesses and Citizens.
"Turkey border gridlock hints at pain to come for Brexit Britain". Financial Times, February 16, 2017

Customs treaties
European Union Customs Union
European Union law
Customs
Treaties of Andorra
Treaties of Monaco
Treaties of San Marino